Stephen Hitchcock Rogers (born June 21, 1930) was a career Foreign Service officer who served as the American Ambassador to Swaziland (now Eswatini) from 1990 until 1993.

Early life and education
When he was nine, Rogers and his family moved to Port Washington, New York and he graduated in 1948 from the Port Washington High School.  He graduated from the Woodrow Wilson School of Public and International Affairs at Princeton University, attending on a Naval ROTC scholarship.  After graduation, he spent three years on active duty.  He arrived for part of his training in Pensacola, Florida just days before the Korean War broke out on June 25, 1950. He ended up serving on a destroyer in the Pacific.  When he was discharged, he studied economics at Columbia University for a year, and took the Foreign Service exam during his first semester, at the end of 1955. He married Mila Kent Brain on June 23, 1956, after they had both received their MA's from Columbia. Rogers attended Harvard University, studying Public Administration, from 1961 to 1962.

References

1930 births
Living people
Ambassadors of the United States to Eswatini
Princeton School of Public and International Affairs alumni
Harvard Kennedy School alumni
United States Foreign Service personnel
People from Port Washington, New York
Columbia University alumni
United States Navy personnel of the Korean War